Zdzisław Tomyślak (born September 24, 1946 in Poznań) is a Polish sprint canoer who competed in the early 1970s. He was eliminated in the semifinals of the K-4 1000 m event at the 1972 Summer Olympics in Munich.

References
 Sports-reference.com profile

External links
 

1946 births
Canoeists at the 1972 Summer Olympics
Living people
Olympic canoeists of Poland
Polish male canoeists
Sportspeople from Poznań